Villalfonsina is a comune and town in the province of Chieti in the Abruzzo region of Italy.  Named after a feudal lord, Alfonso d'Avalos, it is believed he founded the town and developed it into a successful centre of agriculture.

The town is located on the right bank of the Osento River and the inhabitants are called "Villesi".

References

Cities and towns in Abruzzo